Mount Taylor may refer to:

Australia
 Mount Taylor (Australian Capital Territory)
 Mount Taylor Conservation Park, Kangaroo Island, South Australia
 Mount Taylor, a locality north of Bairnsdale, Victoria

Canada
 Mount Taylor (British Columbia)
 Mount Taylor (Yukon)

USA
 Mount Taylor (Florida)
 Mount Taylor (New Mexico)  
 Mount Taylor (Nevada)

Elsewhere
 Mount Taylor, New Zealand
 Mount Taylor (Antarctica)